Leroy D. Eastman (March 21, 1872 – November 20, 1945) was an American businessman, farmer, and politician.

Born in Hazel Green, Wisconsin, Eastman worked in a bank and lumberyard in Cobb, Wisconsin. He also worked in lumberyards in other places in  Wisconsin: Mineral Point, Montfort, and Lancaster, Wisconsin. He was president of the Eastman Cartwright Lumber Company and the Livingston Lumber Company in Livingston, Wisconsin. Eastman also was a farmer and cattle breeder. Eastman served on the Lancaster Common Council from 1906 to 1914 and then on the Grant County Board of Supervisors; Eastman was chairman of the county board. Eastman served in the Wisconsin State Assembly in 1927 and 1929 and was a Republican. Eastman died in Lancaster, Wisconsin.

Notes

1872 births
1945 deaths
People from Hazel Green, Wisconsin
People from Lancaster, Wisconsin
Businesspeople from Wisconsin
Farmers from Wisconsin
County supervisors in Wisconsin
Wisconsin city council members
Republican Party members of the Wisconsin State Assembly